DH5 may refer to:

Airco DH.5 a British First World War fighter aircraft
DH5 alpha, a strain of E. coli
A Good Day to Die Hard, the fifth film in the Die Hard film series